is a Japanese actor who has appeared in over 70 films since 1952. He starred in the film Arashi, which was entered into the 7th Berlin International Film Festival.

Selected filmography

 Arashi (1956) as Saburo Mizusawa
 Snow Country (1957)
 Throne of Blood (1957) as Miki Yoshiteru
The Three Treasures (1959) as Prince Iogi
  (1959)
 Chushingura: Hana no Maki, Yuki no Maki (1962) as Lord Date
 Gorath (1962) as Cadet Astronaut Tatsuo Kanai
 Matango (1963) as Professor Kenji Murai
 Invasion of Astro-Monster (1965) as Tetsuo Torii
 Son of Godzilla (1967) as Goro Maki
 Destroy All Monsters (1968) as Katsuo Yamabe, Captain of the SY-3
 Kill! (1968) as Monnosuke Takei
Battle of the Japan Sea (1969) as Kikuisami Matsui
 Space Amoeba (1970) as Taro Kudo
 Gamera: Guardian of the Universe (1995) as Captain of the Kairyu-Maru
 The Truth about Nanjing (2010) as Heitarō Kimura
The Great Buddha Arrival (2018) as Prime Minister Maki

References

External links

1936 births
Living people
Japanese male film actors
Male actors from Tokyo